Derryvella is a townland in the civil parish of Templeport, County Cavan, Ireland. It lies in the Roman Catholic parish of Corlough and barony of Tullyhaw.

Geography

Derryvella is bounded on the north by Gubnagree townland, on the west by Corracholia Beg and Clarbally townlands and on the east by Derrynaslieve and Tonlegee townlands. Its chief geographical features are a stream, a spring well and dug wells. Derryvella is traversed by minor public roads and rural lanes. The townland covers 113 statute acres.

History

In 1641 the owner of Derryvella was Gillernew (otherwise Gilderneve) McGovern (Gaelic- Giolla na Naomh Mág Samhradháin). He joined the Irish Rebellion of 1641 against British rule. The surviving British settlers later made depositions about the rebels activities, several of which mentioned Gillernew and the other McGoverns.

County Cavan depositions

William Reynolds of Lisnaore made a deposition about the rebellion in Lissanover as follows:

Thomas Crant in his deposition also mentioned the McGoverns among the rebels in Cavan:

Martin Kilhare of Drumlane made depositions about the rebellion in Munlough South and Drumlane:

Ambrose Bedell of Kilmore, County Cavan stated:

Arthur Culme of Cloughoughter Castle stated, inter alia:

Thomas Jones and William Jones of Cornacrum stated:

James Gardiner of Aghabane stated:

County Leitrim depositions

Ralph Carr of Oughteragh parish stated:

Thomas Lewis of Oughteragh parish stated:

Elizabeth Kiddier of County Leitrim stated:

Mary Carr of Oughteragh stated:

County Fermanagh depositions

Thomas Leysance of Mackan stated:

Because Gillernew took part in the Irish Rebellion of 1641 his lands were seized under the Act for the Settlement of Ireland 1652 and granted to Sir Tristram Beresford, 1st Baronet.

The 1652 Commonwealth Survey lists the townland as Dirrevily and the proprietor as Lieutenant-Colonel Tristram Beresford.

Deeds, tenant lists etc. relating to Derryvella from 1650 onwards are available at- 

Beresford then leased the land to John Graham. On 13 March 1706 Marcus Beresford, 1st Earl of Tyrone leased the lands of Derivilly alias Derryvereally to Robert Saunders (Irish lawyer), one of the founders of the village of Swanlinbar, for a term of 99 years. In his will dated 8 March 1707, Saunders left the lands to his son Morley Saunders Morley Saunders later sold his interest in Deryvelly to Colonel John Enery of Bawnboy by deed dated 24 December 1720.

The 1790 Cavan Carvaghs list spells the name as Dirryvilla.

A map of the townland drawn in 1813 is in the National Archives of Ireland, Beresford Estate Maps, depicts the townland as Derryvullagh Bog.

A lease dated 17 September 1816 John Enery of Bawnboy includes Derryvallagh.

The Tithe Applotment Books for 1827 list twenty-five tithepayers in the townland.

The Derryvella Valuation Office Field books are available for September 1839.

In 1841 the population of the townland was 41, being 19 males and 22 females. There were six houses in the townland, all of which were inhabited.

In 1851 the population of the townland was 44, being 19 males and 25 females. There were six houses in the townland, all were inhabited.

Griffith's Valuation of 1857 lists six landholders in the townland.

In 1861 the population of the townland was 24, being 12 males and 12 females. There were four houses in the townland and all were inhabited.

In the 1901 census of Ireland, there are five families listed in the townland,
 and in the 1911 census of Ireland, there are four families listed in the townland.

A 1930s folklore store about the Banshee in Derryvella is available at-

Antiquities

There are no known antiquities in the townland

References

External links
The IreAtlas Townland Data Base

Townlands of County Cavan